Razia or Raziya (Persian: رَضِيَه) is an Asian feminine given name and an occasional surname which is Persianized and derived from the feminine form of the Arabic: "Radhiyyah", meaning "content, contented, pleased, satisfied". It may refer to the following people:

Given name
Razia (singer) (born 1959), singer-songwriter from Madagascar
Razia Bhatti, Pakistani journalist 
Razia Butt, Urdu novelist and playwright from Pakistan 
Razia Iqbal (born 1962), BBC news journalist 
Razia Jan, Afghani humanitarian  
Razia Khan (1936–2011), Bangladeshi novelist 
Syeda Razia Faiz, Bangladeshi politician 
Razia Rahimtoola (1919–1988), Pakistani pediatrician
Razia Sultan (disambiguation)

Surname
Luiz Razia (born 1989), Brazilian racing driver